Sylwester Zawadzki may refer to:
  (1921–1999), president of Supreme Administrative Court of Poland (1980–1981)
  (1932–2014), Polish priest who led the construction of Christ the King Statue, Świebodzin